Herbert Kaiser (16 March 1916 – 5 December 2003) was a Luftwaffe ace and recipient of the Knight's Cross of the Iron Cross during World War II.  The Knight's Cross of the Iron Cross was awarded to recognise extreme battlefield bravery or successful military leadership. He was captured by American troops in May 1945. During his career, he flew 1,200 missions and is credited with 68 aerial victories.

Awards
 Aviator badge
 Front Flying Clasp of the Luftwaffe
 Sudetenland Medal
 Ehrenpokal der Luftwaffe (9 August 1941)
 Iron Cross (1939)
 2nd Class
 1st Class
 Wound Badge (1939)
 in Black
 German Cross in Gold on 30 March 1942 as Leutnant in the 8./Jagdgeschwader 77
 Knight's Cross of the Iron Cross on 14 March 1943 as Oberfeldwebel and pilot in the 8./Jagdgeschwader 77 (later Jagdgeschwader 1)

Notes

References

Citations

Bibliography

External links
Luftwaffe 1939–1945 History
TracesOfWar.com

1916 births
2003 deaths
People from the Province of Saxony
People from Jessen (Elster)
Luftwaffe pilots
German World War II flying aces
Recipients of the Gold German Cross
Recipients of the Knight's Cross of the Iron Cross
German Air Force personnel
German prisoners of war in World War II held by the United States
Military personnel from Saxony-Anhalt